The 1910–11 Indiana Hoosiers men's basketball team represented Indiana University. Their head coach was Oscar Rackle, who was in his 1st and only year. The team played its home games at the Old Assembly Hall in Bloomington, Indiana, and was a member of the Western Conference.

The Hoosiers finished the regular season with an overall record of 11–5 and a conference record of 5–5, finishing 6th in the Western Conference.

Roster

Schedule/Results

|-
!colspan=8| Regular Season
|-

References

Indiana
Indiana Hoosiers men's basketball seasons
Indiana Hoosiers
Indiana Hoosiers